This is a list of Italian football transfers featuring at least one Serie A or Serie B club which were completed after the end of the 2014–15 season and before the end of the 2015 summer transfer window. The window formally opened on 1 July 2015  and closed on 31 August (2 months), but Lega Serie A and Lega Serie B accepted to document any transfer before that day; however those players would only able to play for their new club at the start of 2015–16 season. Free agent could join any club at any time. Ascoli and Virtus Entella will have 10 extra days to complete signatures.
This list doesn't include co-ownership resolutions, which had to be resolved no later than June 25, 2015.

July to September 2015 
Legend
Those clubs in Italic indicate that the player already left on loan in previous season or that the player is a 2015 new signing who immediately left the club.

Footnotes

References
General
 Serie A transfer list 
 Serie B transfer list 
 Serie B transfer list 
 Lega Pro transfer list 
Specific

Italian
2015